= Uterine orgasm =

Orgasm from stimulation of the vulva

An uterine orgasm, or womb orgasm, is an orgasm of the uterus, usually by stimulation of an area just outside the cervix, or the cervix itself, or the vaginal wall adjacent to the uterus. Uterine orgasms can also occur without stimulation. There is some anecdotal evidence to suggest that this is a type of sexual climax.
